Cristhian Presichi Mendoza (born July 28, 1980 in Mexicali, Baja California) is a Mexican professional baseball outfielder who is currently a free agent.

Career
In the 2009 World Baseball Classic edition, he was selected to Team Mexico in place of the injured Alfredo Amézaga. He had one hit in six at bats, that hit being a long home run over the Cuban veteran pitcher Pedro Luis Lazo.

On April 5, 2011, Presichi signed with the Saraperos de Saltillo of the Mexican League. On May 18, 2011, he was assigned to the Acereros de Monclova. On April 19, 2012, the Acereros traded Presichi to the Olmecas de Tabasco for Omar De La Torre. On March 22, 2013, Presichi was assigned to the Broncos de Reynosa. On July 14, 2016, Presichi was traded to the Rieleros de Aguascalientes. He was released by the Rieleros on June 20, 2019. On June 29, 2019, Presichi signed with the Algodoneros de Unión Laguna. Presichi did not play in a game in 2020 due to the cancellation of the Mexican League season because of the COVID-19 pandemic. On November 23, 2020, Presichi was released by the Algodoneros.

References

External links
Career statistics and player information from MiLB.com

1980 births
Living people
Acereros de Monclova players
Águilas de Mexicali players
Algodoneros de Guasave players
Algodoneros de Unión Laguna players
Arizona League Mexico Stars players
Baseball players from Baja California
Broncos de Reynosa players
Charros de Jalisco players
Mexican League baseball first basemen
Mexican League baseball outfielders
Mexican League baseball second basemen
Mexican League baseball third basemen
Mexican people of Italian descent
Olmecas de Tabasco players
Sportspeople from Mexicali
Rieleros de Aguascalientes players
Saraperos de Saltillo players
2009 World Baseball Classic players